William Crowther may refer to:

 William Crowther (Australian politician) (1817–1885)
 William Crowther (New Zealand politician) (1834–1900)
 William Crowther (programmer) (born 1936)